Sokratis Kosmidis (born 30 November 1945) is a Greek lawyer who served as Cabinet Secretary as well as a Member of the Hellenic Parliament. He is known for his combative style and tremendous work ethic.

Biography 
Sokratis Kosmidis was born in Piraeus, the youngest of three children born to Ioannis Kosmidis, a shoemaker, and to his wife, Eleni (née Lolosidou). He is the youngest of three children. He studied Law at the National and Kapodistrian University of Athens. He is married to Domniki Kosmidou, and has two children, Ioanna and Nikolaos.  He currently resides in Voula.

Legal career 
Sokratis Kosmidis worked as a lawyer for 25 years, between 1968 and 1993. During this time, Kosmidis served the following positions in his home city of Piraeus: From 1975 to 1978, he was director and columnist of the newspaper 'Piraeus Echoes'; Between 1984 and 1987, he sat on the board of directors of the Piraeus Lawyer Association; From 1982 to 1989, he was president of the board of directors of the Insurance Fund for Maritime Agents and Employees.

Following his two-year period as Secretary of the Ministry of Trade, from 1993-1995, Kosmidis returned to practice law for a few months, before retiring from law altogether.

Government career 
Following the elections of 1993, Kosmidis was recruited by Minister of Trade Costas Simitis to the Ministry of Trade. He was General Secretary of the Ministry of Trade for two years, before returning to practice Law. After working as a lawyer for a few more months, he was recruited yet again, this time to become General Secretary of the Ministry of Public Order. After seven months, however, he was appointed General Secretary to the Government by new Prime Minister Costas Simitis, a position which he immediately accepted and held for eight years. Kosmidis became the first General Secretary to leave a substantial imprint on the running of the Greek core executive. 

Following the elections of 2004, Kosmidis, now a prominent member of the PASOK party, became a Member of the Hellenic Parliament. He retired in 2007.

Books 

 Απάνθισμα άρθρων και σχολίων (1981) (Collection of Articles and Comments)
 Αυτό το κράτος μπορεί να διοικηθή;  (1996) (Can this state manage?) 
 Πολιτική για το φάρμακο (2002)  (Drug Policy) 
 Μια «αχρείαστη» Συνταγματική Αναθεώρηση (2007) (An unnecessary Constitutional Revision)
 Εκσυγχρονισμός και μεταρρυθμίσεις (2010) (Modernization and Reforms)

1943 births
Living people
20th-century Greek lawyers
Politicians from Piraeus
PASOK politicians
Greek columnists
Greek MPs 2004–2007